In financial mathematics and stochastic optimization, the concept of risk measure is used to quantify the risk involved in a random outcome or risk position. Many risk measures have hitherto been proposed, each having certain characteristics. The entropic value at risk (EVaR) is a coherent risk measure introduced by Ahmadi-Javid, which is an upper bound for the value at risk (VaR) and the conditional value at risk (CVaR), obtained from the Chernoff inequality. The EVaR can also be represented by using the concept of relative entropy. Because of its connection with the VaR and the relative entropy, this risk measure is called "entropic value at risk". The EVaR was developed to tackle some computational inefficiencies of the CVaR. Getting inspiration from the dual representation of the EVaR, Ahmadi-Javid developed a wide class of coherent risk measures, called g-entropic risk measures. Both the CVaR and the EVaR are members of this class.

Definition 
Let  be a random variable and  be the set of all Borel measurable functions  whose moment-generating function  exists for all .

In finance, the random variable  in the above equation, is used to model the losses of a portfolio.

Consider the Chernoff inequality

Solving the equation  for  results in 

By considering the equation, we see that 

which shows the relationship between the EVaR and the Chernoff inequality. It is worth noting that  is the entropic risk measure or exponential premium, which is a concept used in finance and insurance, respectively.

Let  be the set of all Borel measurable functions  whose moment-generating function  exists for all . The dual representation (or robust representation) of the EVaR is as follows:

Note that 

 

The dual representation of the EVaR discloses the reason behind its naming.

Properties
 The EVaR is a coherent risk measure.

 The moment-generating function  can be represented by the EVaR: for all  and 

 For ,  for all  if and only if  for all .

 The entropic risk measure with parameter  can be represented by means of the EVaR: for all  and 

 The EVaR with confidence level  is the tightest possible upper bound that can be obtained from the Chernoff inequality for the VaR and the CVaR with confidence level ;

 The following inequality holds for the EVaR: 

Examples

For 

For 

Optimization
Let  be a risk measure. Consider the optimization problem

where  is an -dimensional real decision vector,  is an -dimensional real random vector with a known probability distribution and the function  is a Borel measurable function for all values  If  then the optimization problem turns into:

Let  be the support of the random vector  If  is convex for all , then the objective function of the problem is also convex. If  has the form

which is computationally tractable. But for this case, if one uses the CVaR in problem, then the resulting problem becomes as follows:

For example, assume that  are independent discrete random variables that take  distinct values. For illustration, assume that  and the summation of two numbers takes  seconds. For computing the objective function of problem one needs about  years, whereas the evaluation of objective function of problem takes about  seconds. This shows that formulation with the EVaR outperforms the formulation with the CVaR (see  for more details).

Generalization (g-entropic risk measures)
The -entropic risk measure with divergence level  is defined as

A primal representation of the class of -entropic risk measures can be obtained as follows:

By considering

For more results on -entropic risk measures see.

Disciplined Convex Programming Framework

The disciplined convex programming framework of sample EVaR was proposed by Cajas and has the following form:

If we define  as the vector of weights for  assets,  the matrix of returns and  the mean vector of assets, we can posed the minimization of the expected EVaR given a level of expected portfolio return  as follows.

Applying the disciplined convex programming framework of EVaR to uncompounded cumulative returns distribution, Cajas proposed the entropic drawdown at risk(EDaR) optimization problem. We can posed the minimization of the expected EDaR given a level of expected return  as follows:

For other problems like risk parity, maximization of return/risk ratio or constraints on maximum risk levels for EVaR and EDaR, you can see  for more details.

The advantage of model EVaR and EDaR using a disciplined convex programming framework, is that we can use softwares like CVXPY  or MOSEK to model this portfolio optimization problems. EVaR and EDaR are implemented in the python package Riskfolio-Lib.

See also 
 Stochastic optimization
 Risk measure
 Coherent risk measure
 Value at risk
 Conditional value at risk
 Expected shortfall
 Entropic risk measure
 Kullback–Leibler divergence
 Generalized relative entropy

References

Financial risk modeling
Utility